Prewitt Reservoir is an irrigation and recreation reservoir in Washington and Logan counties in northeastern Colorado. When full, the reservoir's surface area is 2,340 acres. The reservoir is located about 18 miles northeast of Fort Morgan, Colorado along the South Platte River.

History

Prewitt Reservoir was financed and built by the Great Western Sugar Company and began construction in 1910. The reservoir helps supply sufficient water for the irrigation of sugar beets. Construction was completed in 1912.

Fishing
Popular with fishermen, the reservoir is stocked with walleye, saugeye, channel catfish, wipers and black crappie.

References

Reservoirs in Colorado
Protected areas of Logan County, Colorado
Protected areas of Washington County, Colorado
Bodies of water of Logan County, Colorado
Bodies of water of Washington County, Colorado
1912 establishments in Colorado